Baruch Lifshitz (1913, Davyd-Haradok – 1976, Tel Aviv) was a Belarusian professor of the Department of Classics at the Hebrew University of Jerusalem. He participated in excavations in Israel, and his research has been published in different referenced works.

Life 
Lifshitz was born in 1913 at Davyd-Haradok in Byelorussia, where he received his early education. He studied at the Vilnius University, but had to abandon his studies and flee because of the outbreak of World War II. Lifshitz fled to Tashkent, where he was conscripted into the Red Army.

In 1946, he arrived in Palestine, and began studying history and classics at the Hebrew University of Jerusalem. He earned his M.A in 1952, and his Ph.D. in 1957 at Jerusalem. His dissertation was entitled The Protection of Graves in Grave Inscriptions in Eretz-Israel, and while preparing his doctoral thesis, he studied Greek epigraphy in Paris with professor Louis Robert.

Lifshitz was Senior Lecturer in Classics and later a professor at The Hebrew University of Jerusalem. He began working at the Hebrew University in 1952 as a Senior scholar. In 1957 he became an Instructor, and in 1962 a lecturer.

During some twenty years of his life he published contributions to Jewish and Latin epigraphy, study of the Greek and Latin inscriptions of Palestines. He was the first to compile inscriptions of the synagogue's founders and donors in his work Donateurs et fondateurs dans les synagogues juives répertoire des dédicaces grecques relatives à la construction et à la réfection des synagogues. He has also worked as an editor and translator of ancient manuscripts. His papers have been published in more than 70 scholarly journals. Yigael Yadin has published some of his research in Israel Exploration Journal by the Israel Exploration Society.

Baruch Lifshitz died on September 18, 1976 in Tel Aviv, Israel.

Some works

Thesis

Books

Articles

References 

1913 births
1976 deaths
Academic staff of the Hebrew University of Jerusalem
Hebrew University of Jerusalem alumni